A transporter erector launcher (TEL) is a missile vehicle with an integrated tractor unit that can carry, elevate to firing position and launch one or more missiles.

History
Such vehicles exist for both surface-to-air missiles and surface-to-surface missiles. Early on, such missiles were launched from fixed sites and had to be loaded onto trucks for transport, making them more vulnerable to attack, since once they were spotted by the enemy they could not easily be relocated, and if they were it often took hours or even days to prepare them for launch once they reached their new site.

Usually a number of TELs and TELARs are linked to one command post vehicle (CP or CPV). They may use target information from target acquisition, designation and guidance radar (TADAGR or TAR).

Transporter erector launcher and radar 
A transporter erector launcher and radar (TELAR) is a type of TEL that also incorporates part or all of the radar system necessary for firing the surface-to-air missile(s). Such vehicles have the capability of being autonomous, greatly enhancing their effectiveness. With this type of system each vehicle can fight regardless of the state or presence of support vehicles. The TEL or TELAR may have a rotating turntable that it can use to aim the missiles. The vehicle may have to turn to aim the missiles or they may fire straight up.

Related launchers

Transporter launcher and radar (TLAR) 
A transporter launcher and radar (TLAR) is the same as a TELAR without the erector capability, because the missile in question is transported in the launch-ready position. An example is the 9K330 Tor, which mounts a vertical launching system-style block of SAMs.

Mobile erector launcher (MEL) 

The Patriot missile system has a towed launch vehicle or mobile erector launcher (MEL).

Rocket launch vehicle 

In spaceflight, TELs are support structures used to transport a rocket launch vehicle horizontally from an assembly facility to a nearby fixed launch pad where it is raised vertical for launch. This system is used, for example, by SpaceX for its launch vehicles (Falcon 9 & Heavy, not Starship), but they call it a "transporter erector".

Types
 Taian TA580/TAS5380 8×8 TEL
 Wanshan WS51200 16 wheeled TEL
 M270 Multiple Launch Rocket System
 Pinaka multi barrel rocket launcher
 S-300 missile system - 8 wheeled TEL or MT-T tracked transporter
 Tupol ICBM system
 S-400 missile system
 MAZ-547A/MAZ-7916 - 12 wheeled TEL
 MAZ-7917 - 14 wheeled TEL
 MZKT-79221 - 16 wheeled TEL
 ASTROS II 6x6 wheeled rocket artillery launcher
 SPYDER

Gallery

See also

 Meillerwagen, the earliest-designed mobile rocket erection vehicle (trailer) ever deployed  
 Missile launch facility

References

Self-propelled anti-aircraft weapons
Self-propelled rocket launchers
Weapon fixtures
Rocket launchers
Missile launchers